Thorben Stadler (born 8 February 1990) is a German footballer who is playing for 1.FC Mühlhausen. His former clubs include Karlsruher SC, Stuttgarter Kickers and SSV Jahn Regensburg.

References

External links
 

1990 births
Living people
German footballers
Germany youth international footballers
Karlsruher SC II players
Karlsruher SC players
Stuttgarter Kickers players
SSV Jahn Regensburg players
2. Bundesliga players
3. Liga players
Regionalliga players
FC Astoria Walldorf players
Association football fullbacks